Hypobapta is a genus of moths in the family Geometridae described by Prout in 1912.

Species
 Hypobapta barnardi Goldfinch, 1929
 Hypobapta diffundens (Lucas, 1891) (=Hypochroma eugramma Lower 1892)
 Hypobapta percomptaria (Guenée, 1857)
 Hypobapta tachyhalotaria Hausmann & Sommerer, 2009
 Hypobapta xenomorpha (Lower, 1915)

References

External links

Pseudoterpnini
Geometridae genera
Taxa named by Louis Beethoven Prout
Moths described in 1912